Zalaegerszegi TE and Vasas SC finished the 2011–12 season in the bottom two places of the table and thus were relegated to their respective NB II divisions. Vasas ended an 8-year stay in the top league. Zalaegerszeg ended an 18-year stay in the top league.
The two relegated teams were replaced with the champions of the two 2011–12 NB II groups, Egri FC of the East Group and MTK Budapest FC of the West Group. MTK made their immediate comeback to the league, while Eger returned to the competition after an absence of 26 seasons.

Eastern group

Stadium and locations

League table

Results

Western group

Stadium and locations

League table

References

Nemzeti Bajnokság II seasons
2012–13 in Hungarian football
Hun